The Syrian Basketball Super Cup is the top-tier level national domestic basketball super cup competition, that is played between professional clubs in Syria. It was founded in 2021 as a new super cup composed of the best Syrian clubs. In 2022, two clubs from the Lebanese Basketball League joined the Super Cup.

Format
According to the current format of the competition, the four best ranked teams from the previous season of the Syrian Basketball League, together with the winner of the Syrian Cup, will automatically qualify. In 2022, the Syrian Basketball Federation agreed with the Lebanese Basketball Federation that in the 2022-23 season, 2 clubs from the Lebanese Basketball League will also start in the competition.

In the first round, the teams play one match each, and the two best advance to the finals. The final is played in one match. The competition takes place every year in October.

Winners

Titles by club

Titles by city
Two clubs have won the Syrian Basketball Super Cup.

Super Cup 2021

First round

Finals

Super Cup 2022

First round

Play-offs

Finals
The match had to be abandoned earlier because Al-Wahda fans injured Abdulwahab Al-Hamwi. The judges awarded the victory to Al-Wahda.

Sponsorship
The main sponsors of the tournament are Syria Gulf Bank, Fatora, Lactomil, Sinalco, Syriatel, Cham Wings, Sama TV and Syria TV.

See also
Syrian Basketball Federation
Syrian Basketball League

References

Basketball competitions in Syria
Basketball leagues in Asia
Sports leagues established in 2021
Basketball